is a Japanese tokusatsu drama written by Takuro Fukuda that serves as the 26th entry in the Kamen Rider franchise and the 17th entry in the Heisei era.

Main characters

Takeru Tenkūji
 is the current heir to Daitenkū-ji who displays in an interest in historical figures after his ghost hunter father, Ryū, left him the tsuba from Miyamoto Musashi's katana, which the former wears as a necklace, and enjoys reading from a book titled . Wishing to follow in his father's footsteps despite being unable to see ghosts, Takeru receives a Ghost Eyecon on his 18th birthday, which allows him to see monstrous ghosts called Gamma before they kill him for other Eyecons. A mysterious hermit brings Takeru back to life as a ghost and grants him the ability to transform into Kamen Rider Ghost as the latter has 99 days to find 15 Eyecons based on famous historical figures to fully restore his life.

After seeing his childhood friend Makoto Fukami become the cold Kamen Rider Specter as a result of his sister Kanon's body being trapped in the Gamma World, Takeru sacrifices the opportunity to revive himself to save Kanon instead and gains the ability to enter people's memories following his first trip to the Gamma World. Along the way, Takeru discovers he disrespected Ryū for involving him in the latter's ghost hunting expeditions, but his father did so because of his potential to bring peace between the human and Gamma Worlds. Additionally, Takeru's Eyecon was supposed to contain Ryū's soul and, if he does not restore his original body within another 99 days, both Tenkūjis will disappear forever. While doing so, Takeru and his allies save the world from the Gammisers and he receives multiple wishes from the Great Eye in recognition of his good deeds. Using one to fully revive himself, Takeru returns to high school to finish his education.

In the tie-in novel Kamen Rider Ghost: Memories to the Future, Takeru marries Chloe after sacrificing the Mugen Eyecon and half of his life force with the Great Eye's help, eventually having a son named Ayumu not long after. In the near future, the lack of his Mugen Eyecon prevents him from accessing his full potential and he is absorbed by the Great Demia. However, Takeru is rescued after Ayumu dons the mantle of Ghost and kills the Great Demia without endangering Takeru's life, allowing him to reunite with his family once more.

Takeru utilizes the  belt in conjunction with one of several  to transform into Kamen Rider Ghost. Without an Eyecon, he starts out in a powerless  form, which serves as the base for a Hoodie Ghost summoned by an Eyecon to drape itself over him and become a more powerful  form. Takeru's many forms are as follows:

: Takeru's default form accessed from the eponymous Eyecon, which contains his soul, that grants levitation capabilities. In this form, he can wield the Gan Gun Saber in either its sword-like , which allows him to perform the  finisher, or its double-bladed , which allows him to perform the  finisher.
: The evolved form of Ore Damashii accessed from the eponymous Eyecon powered by Ryū's soul that enhances existing Damashii forms and allows him to perform the  finisher. Initially, this form served as Takeru's sole means of accessing Goemon, Ryoma, and Himiko Damashii in order to keep up with their enormous power until his continuous development as a Kamen Rider allowed him to access their forms with Ore Damashii. This form first appears in the non-canonical crossover film Kamen Rider × Kamen Rider Ghost & Drive: Super Movie War Genesis.

Furthermore, Takeru possesses forms that appear in supplemental media connected to the series:
: A Kamen Rider Drive-themed form that grants superhuman speed and the use of the former's Handle-Ken and Door-Ju. This form appears exclusively in the web series Kamen Rider Ghost: Legendary! Riders' Souls! and the film Kamen Rider 1.
: A Kamen Rider Gaim-themed form that grants increased strength and the use of the former's Daidaimaru and Musou Saber. This form appears exclusively in the web series Kamen Rider Ghost: Legendary! Riders' Souls! and the crossover film Kamen Rider 1.
: A Kamen Rider Wizard-themed form that grants pyromancy-enhanced kicking capabilities, the ability to channel Wizard Ring spells, and the use of the former's WizarSwordGun. This form appears exclusively in the web series Kamen Rider Ghost: Legendary! Riders' Souls! and the crossover film Kamen Rider 1.
: A Kamen Rider 1-themed form that grants increased hand-to-hand combat capabilities. This form appears exclusively in the DVD-exclusive episode of the web series Kamen Rider Ghost: Legendary! Riders' Souls!.
: A namesake-themed fusion form that grants access to the combined powers of Takeru's 16 Heisei Kamen Rider predecessors. This form appears exclusively in the DVD-exclusive final episode of the web series Kamen Rider Ghost: Legendary! Riders' Souls!.
: A Kamen Rider Ex-Aid-themed form that grants increased agility and the use of the former's Gashacon Breaker. This form appears exclusively in the crossover film Kamen Rider Heisei Generations: Dr. Pac-Man vs. Ex-Aid & Ghost with Legend Rider.

Akari Tsukimura
 is Takeru's childhood friend, college student, and physics major who wishes to be a successful scientist like her teachers. A rationally-minded young woman, she experiences difficulty in believing anything related to the supernatural and strives to find logical explanations despite learning of what happened to Takeru and assisting in reviving him. Along the way, she develops  spray, which allows her to temporarily see Takeru as Kamen Rider Ghost and Gamma without an Eyecon. After finding a piece of a Gamma Eyecon, she is able to weaponize the Shiranui spray and use it to defend herself against Gamma. Following the Gammisers' defeat and Takeru's resurrection, she assists him in finishing his education.

Makoto Fukami
, original name , is an artificial human created by Danton before his father Daigo spirited him and his sister Kanon to the human world and raised them until their mother died. Ten years prior to the series, Daigo left Makoto and Kanon at Daitenkū-ji, where the young Fukamis befriended Takeru and transported to Gamma World as a result of Chikara Saionji's machinations. After meeting Alia and Alain, Kanon's body died, leaving her soul trapped in a Gamma Eyecon. Seeking to revive her, Makoto obtained the means to become , joined forces with Saionji and Alain, and returned to the human world to find 15 Eyecons, clashing with Takeru in the process. After Takeru gathers the 15 Eyecons and uses his wish to revive Kanon, Makoto vows to help revive him and leaves Kanon in Takeru and his allies' care while Makoto returns to Gamma World to regain his body with Javel's help. Following the Gammisers' defeat, Makoto and Kanon help Alain reform Gamma World.

During the events of the film Kamen Rider Ghost the Movie: The 100 Eyecons and Ghost's Fated Moment and the V-Cinema Ghost Re:Birth: Kamen Rider Specter, Makoto encounters and reconciles with Daigo upon learning of the latter's reasons for leaving him and Kanon as well as learns of his origins before stopping Danton from destroying Gamma World.

Similarly to Takeru, Makoto utilizes a Ghost Driver and his own series of Eyecons to transform into Kamen Rider Specter. In his default form, he wields the Gan Gun Hand in its club-like , which allows him to perform the  finisher. He can also access other Damashii forms, which are as follows:

: The evolved form of Makoto's default form accessed from the eponymous Eyecon powered by the Gammisers that enhances existing Damashii forms, grants the use of the  ability where he manifests a pair of energy wings, and allows him to perform the  finisher. As a side effect, the user will be left uncontrollable unless they use the Eyecon's power for righteousness.
This form appears exclusively in the V-Cinema Kamen Rider Ghost Re:Birth: Kamen Rider Specter.

Also like Takeru, Makoto also possesses forms that appear in supplemental media connected to the series:
: A Kamen Rider W-themed form that grants aerokinesis-enhanced kicking capabilities and the use of the former's Metal Shaft. This form appears exclusively in the web series Kamen Rider Ghost: Legendary! Riders' Souls! and the film Kamen Rider 1.
: A Kamen Rider Fourze-themed form that grants the use of the former's Fourze Modules. This form appears exclusively in the web series Kamen Rider Ghost: Legendary! Riders' Souls! and the film Kamen Rider 1.
: A Kamen Rider OOO-themed form that grants the use of the former's Tora Claws and Medajaribur. This form appears exclusively in the web series Kamen Rider Ghost: Legendary! Riders' Souls! and the film Kamen Rider 1.

Alain
 is the son of Gamma emperor, Adonis, who seeks the Eyecons to examine their power and follows a twisted form of justice. He initially assists his family in combating Takeru Tenkūji and Makoto Fukami until Alain is framed for his father's apparent death. Unaware of his brother, Adel's, treachery, Alain attempts to take the throne from him while trying to adjust to life in the human world. Due to being rescued by Takeru and Makoto several times, Alain became honor-bound to help them. Upon learning that Adonis is alive, but trapped in his mortal body, Alain searches for him, learning the reason why he and the Gammas are immortal and learning more about Takeru along the way. After Adonis sacrifices himself to save him, Alain promises to carry out his father's will by saving the human and Gamma worlds, though he is temporarily unable to continue fighting until Makoto helps him come to terms with Adonis' death, vowing to defeat Adel himself. Following the Gammisers' defeat and the end of the Demia Project, Alain is pardoned and returns to his homeworld to help restructure the Gamma world's society with Makoto and his sister Kanon's help.

As of the crossover film Kamen Rider Heisei Generations: Dr. Pac-Man vs. Ex-Aid & Ghost with Legend Rider and the V-Cinema Ghost Re-Birth: Kamen Rider Specter, Alain has married Kanon.

Utilizing the  brace and the  Eyecon, the latter of which also allows him to brainwash Ghost Driver users, Alain can transform into . Due to the Necrom Eyecon being a prototype, Alain is forced to absorb other Gamma to sustain his Rider energy and is unable to lose his temper lest the Eyecon destroys his body. Similarly to Takeru and Makoto, Alain also possesses other Eyecons, which allow him to assume the following Damashii forms:

: The evolved form of Alain's default form accessed from the eponymous Eyecon powered by friendship that allows him to perform the  finisher. This form appears exclusively in Kamen Rider Ghost Re:Birth: Kamen Rider Specter.

Recurring characters

Hoodie Ghosts
After being unlocked from an object tied to them, said figures later inhabit their respective Eyecons and can be summoned to augment their users with their powers. As they are sentient beings in their own right, they can also move around within their personal Eyecons and refuse cooperation with any user they deem unworthy.

15 heroic Eyecons
The main 15 heroic Eyecons are a group of Hoodie Ghosts who Ryū Tenkūji carefully selected to serve as an antithesis to the Gammisers under Edith's suggestions. By gathering them around the monolith, they have the ability to summon the Great Eye from the Planet Gamma to grant the wish of a Ghost Driver user. Although most of them are mainly used by Kamen Rider Ghost, especially to invoke Grateful Damashii, others are also utilized by Kamen Riders Specter and Necrom.

: A Miyamoto Musashi-themed form that grants Ghost expert sword fighting capabilities.
: A Thomas Edison-themed form that grants Ghost electrokinesis. It is also shared with Specter on several occasions, allowing him to utilize the Gan Gun Hand as an electroshock weapon.
: A Robin Hood-themed form that grants Ghost expert archery capabilities. In this form, he combines the Gan Gun Saber and the  device to access the former's , which allows him to perform the  finisher.
: An Isaac Newton-themed form that grants Ghost gyrokinesis via the orb-like  and  gauntlets. This form first appears in the film Kamen Rider Drive: Surprise Future.
: A Ludwig van Beethoven-themed form that grants Ghost symphokinesis.
: A namesake-themed form that grants Ghost expert sharpshooting capabilities. In this form, he can either combine the Gan Gun Saber and the  device to access the former's , which allows him to perform the  finisher, or dual wield the Gan Gun Saber and Bat Clock in their Gun Modes.
: A namesake-themed form that grants Ghost increased strength and durability. In this form, he combines the Gan Gun Saber and the  device to access the former's , which allows him to perform the  finisher.
: An Ishikawa Goemon-themed form that grants Ghost Toucon Boost Damashii increased speed and agility. In this form, he utilizes a reverse grip-based fighting style with the Sunglasseslasher.
: A Sakamoto Ryōma-themed form that grants Ghost Toucon Boost Damashii ergokinesis and the use of propulsive force.
: A namesake-themed form that grants Ghost Toucon Boost Damashii the use of magical abilities. In this form, he utilizes the Sunglasseslasher as a wand to cast spells.
: An Oda Nobunaga-themed form that grants Specter increased shooting accuracy.
: A namesake-themed form that grants Specter increased slashing capabilities. In this form, he combines the Gan Gun Hand and the  device to access the former's , which allows him to perform the  finisher.
: A Harry Houdini-themed form that combines Specter with the Machine Hoodie to grant him alysídakinesis, teleportation, and flight capabilities. In this form, he can change the Machine Hoodie into its hoverboard-like .
: A Brothers Grimm-themed form that equips Necrom with the twin shoulder-mounted  extendable nibs. Unlike the other Hoodie Ghosts, the Grimm Hoodie Ghost manifests as two separate spirits representing Jacob and Wilhelm Grimm before fusing with each other to empower Necrom. When used by a Gamma Superior, it grants the ability to cast illusions.
: A namesake-themed form that arms Necrom with the  wind and fire wheel and grants the use of familiar spirits based on Sanzo's companions Sun Wukong, Zhu Bajie, and Sha Wujing for combat assistance.

Other heroic Eyecons
: A namesake-themed form that allows Ghost to access mental abilities through zen meditation. It appears exclusively in the DVD special Kamen Rider Ghost: Ikkyu Intimacy! Awaken, My Quick Wit Power!!.
: A namesake-themed form that allows Specter to weaponize the Pythagorean theorem in the form of energy attacks. It appears exclusively in the DVD special Kamen Rider Ghost: Ikkyu Intimacy! Awaken, My Quick Wit Power!!.
: A Charles Darwin-themed form that appears exclusively in the arcade game Kamen Rider Ganbarizing. In Kamen Rider Ghost the Movie: The 100 Eyecons and Ghost's Fated Moment, Ghost Toucon Boost Damashii uses Darwin's Eyecon to assume , which grants the ability to manipulate the flow of evolution.
: An Edo period-themed form that grants Ghost the combined powers of Oda Nobunaga, Toyotomi Hideyoshi, and Tokugawa Ieyasu's spirits as well as access to Kamen Riders Specter and Necrom's weapons. This form appears exclusively in the crossover film Kamen Rider Heisei Generations: Dr. Pac-Man vs. Ex-Aid & Ghost with Legend Rider.
: A namesake-themed form that grants Ghost the combined powers of Kondō Isami, Hijikata Toshizō, and Okita Sōji's spirits. This form appears exclusively in the stage show Kamen Rider Ghost: Final Stage & Program Cast Talk Show.

Daitenkū-ji
 is a fictional Buddhist temple that has been in the Tenkūji family's care for generations and serves as the home and base of operations for the series' main characters.

Onari
 is a Buddhist monk and current caretaker of Daitenkū-ji due to Takeru being too young to do so who openly expresses his frustrations and is open to believing in the supernatural, but lacks the spiritual awareness to see Gamma without Akari Tsukimura's Shiranui spray or Takeru's Kumo Lantern. Over the course of the series and assisting in Takeru's fight against the Gamma, Onari develops an inferiority complex, believing himself to be a nuisance to the fight and desiring to provide better support.

As revealed in the tie-in novel Kamen Rider Ghost: Memories to the Future, Onari was an aspiring Mohawk guitarist who encounters Ryū after being saved from a Gamma Assault who arrived on Earth for reconnaissance purposes, eventually taking up the role of Daitenkū-ji's monk out of respect to his rescuer. At some point after the Great Eyeser's defeat, Onari left to establish his own private investigation service after getting into an argument with Javel, which also results in the former jumping into the crossfire between the Kamen Riders and Bi-Kaiser. After the battle, Onari returns to Daitenkū-ji, reconciles with Javel once the two settle their differences, and resumes his position as the acting chief priest.

Shibuya Hachiōji
 is an ascetic monk training at Daitenkū-ji who is prone to jumping to conclusions that cause more harm than good and assigned to investigate paranormal phenomena alongside Narita Kisarazu. Outside of his work, Shibuya has a troubled relationship with his mother, Miho, who nags him for not being more like his father, Tetsuya, who died sometime after Shibuya was born. Despite this, Shibuya still cares for his mother and eventually reconciles with her.

Narita Kisarazu
 is a laid-back ascetic monk training at Daitenkū-ji who is assigned to investigate paranormal phenomena alongside Shibuya Hachiōji.

Edith
 is a magistrate of the Gamma World and Adonis' closest ally who proposed the idea of a machine capable of granting immortality by transferring their people's souls into Eyecons. While Adonis used the Great Eye's power to complete Edith's machine, the latter was shocked to discover that it was slowly killing their people instead. When Adonis launched an invasion on the human world to power the machine, Edith attempted to contact the Great Eye, but was stopped by the Gammisers, which he created to protect it. A decade prior to the series, Edith was defeated by and joined forces with Ryū Tenkūji and Daigo Fukami to stop the Gamma, developing Ghost Drivers and heroic Eyecons for future use.

In the present, in response to Ryū's son Takeru's death by a Gamma, Edith is forced to modify the former's plan by infusing Takeru's soul into an Eyecon, giving him a Ghost Driver, and tasking him with collecting the heroic Eyecons with the promise of reviving him. Taking on the alias of a playful and mysterious , Edith takes up residence in Daitenkū-ji's basement to watch over Takeru and his friends while occasionally and secretly returning to Gamma World to oversee the Gammas' progress. After Adonis' son Adel succeeds him and threatens the Gamma, Edith is forced to reveal his true colors while dragging the Gamma emperor to Earth to prevent him from harnessing the Great Eye's power and saving Takeru and Adel's brother Alain from the Perfect Gammiser. With his secret exposed and following Adel and the Gammisers' defeat, Edith remains in Daitenkū-ji and takes over Ryū's former position as Daitenkū-ji's head priest.

Utilizing a personal Gamma Ultima Eyecon, Edith can transform into , a jet-black variant of the original Gamma Ultima form. During Takeru and his allies' final battle with Adel and the Gammisers, Edith temporarily transforms into Kamen Rider Dark Ghost to maintain the portal connecting the human and Gamma worlds and attempt to join the fight before Yurusen pulled him out due to his old age.

Yurusen
 is Edith's pet cat who manifests as a sentient ghostly sprite to serve as his familiar and assistant to Takeru.

Ryū Tenkūji
 is Takeru's father and the previous caretaker of Daitenkū-ji. Ten years prior to the series, the former left on a ghost hunting expedition with his friends Chikara Saionji and Kenjirō Igarashi to research the monolith underneath Daitenkū-ji. Along the way, Ryū discovered an Eyecon and the Gammas. To prevent a war between Gamma World and his own, Ryū was forced to involve Takeru after sensing his potential for bringing peace between the two worlds. After Saionji sent Makoto and Kanon Fukami to Gamma World, Ryū leads a failed expedition to save them. Five years later, Ryū arranged for Takeru to receive the Ore Eyecon, which the former hoped would contain his soul and allow Takeru to fight Gammas in a duplicate body. After being killed by Adel however, Ryū was forced to adjust his plans. In the present, the latter gives up his soul to power the Toucon Boost Eyecon and buy Takeru time to revive himself.

In the tie-in novel Kamen Rider Ghost: Memories to the Future, it is revealed Ryū is the previous holder of Kamen Rider Ghost's mantle, having previously assumed a red-colored form called  and fought the invading Gamma with the spirit of Miyamoto Musashi by his side and using the Gan Gun Saber's Nitouryu Mode as his weapon of choice. Having spent his final days fighting the invading Gamma forces, Ryū fought a young Adel before he was summoned by Saionji. Despite winning the fight with Musashi's help, Ryū was killed soon after when Adel transferred his spirit to a backup Eyecon. In addition, Ryū also joined forces with the younger Takeru and Ayumu in defeating Great Demia's clone during its attempt to prevent the young Tenkūji's birth in the past.

Gamma
The  are extra-dimensional creatures that appear as ghosts in the physical world and are descended from humans who migrated from Earth to the Gamma World during the Yayoi period and lived peacefully. Though they founded an empire, the Gamma World was eventually devastated by environmental pollution associated with the rapid development of science and technology. Over time, Adonis and Edith developed a means of using the Great Eye's power to preserve Gamma World populace's bodies in stasis capsules while their souls are transferred into Eyecons that use nanotechnology to project facsimiles of their original bodies. However, the life support system required a great amount of energy to be maintained and several Gamma World residents began to die as such.

To compensate for this defect, Adonis' son Adel and Gamma scientist Igor suggested invading the human world, to which Adonis reluctantly agreed until he saw how his actions endangered the human world's inhabitants. This would lead to Adel overthrowing his father and being manipulated by the Gammisers for their own ends. Following Adel and the Gammisers' demise, the Great Eye's departure, the Demia Project being shut down, and peace being restored to the Gamma World, Alain returns to rebuild Gamma World's society.

Each Gamma possesses a  that it can fuse with an object in the human world to help them transform from their  into a more powerful form. Gamma Ultimas in particular are also capable of empowering themselves further via external methods, such as being possessed by a Gammiser, and become . Gammas who absorb wild Hoodie Ghosts or constructs can transform further into a monstrous , though they can be reverted back if they are separated from the Hoodie Ghost or construct. Similarly to the Hoodie Ghosts, Gammas can also use their Eyecons to possess living humans.

Javel
 is a Gamma Superior loyal to Adel who sees Alain as foolish, though he allows Adonis to send him to support Alain in collecting the 15 heroic Eyecons. Despite being destroyed by Kamen Riders Ghost and Specter on separate occasions, Javel is able to use Igor's technology to resurrect himself. After Adel overthrows Adonis, Javel is promoted to Gamma Ultima and tasked with eliminating Alain, but is defeated by Ghost Grateful Damashii despite being possessed by Gammiser Fire and transformed into a Gamma Ultima Fire. When Igor reveals he is no longer needed, Javel goes rogue and makes a final attempt at killing his enemies, only to discover he is dying of starvation due to reverting to his mortal body, which he hasn't done in years. Onari saves his life, causing Javel to realize the error of his ways and joins forces with Ghost, Specter, and their allies, though he initially maintains his mission to kill Alain until the Gamma prince defeats Javel in combat and the Gamma sees how Alain has changed. With Onari's encouragement, Javel changes his mission to learning more about the human world's environment. Amidst the Great Eyeser's attack, Javel sacrifices himself to save Alain, but Ghost destroys the Great Eyeser, reviving Javel in the process. Following this, Javel chooses to stay at Daitenkū-ji.

In combat, Javel can move at superhuman speeds, can produce energy waves from his palms, and possesses offensive power comparable to the Kamen Riders.

Adel
 is Alain's older brother and the second-highest authority in the Gamma World next to his father, Adonis. After convincing his father to invade the human world, Adel secretly works to terraform Earth by killing Ryū Tenkūji to stop him from interfering and sending Alain to retrieve the 15 heroic Eyecons. Eventually deeming Adonis too weak to follow through on the invasion, Adel destroys his Eyecon, imprisons him, and frames Alain for regicide while he assumes Gamma World's throne. Following a failed attempt at using the Demia Project to turn everyone in Gamma World and the human world into copies of himself, his sister Alia and Ryū's son Takeru Tenkūji help Adel realize the error of his ways and admit that he killed Ryū out of jealousy. The Gammisers attempt to take over his body, but Adel urges Takeru to kill him. Before departing to the afterlife, Adel thanks Takeru for saving him and expresses the hope that his siblings do not make the same mistakes that he did.

As a Gamma Ultima, Adel can disable projectiles and melt objects by touching them. As the Perfect Gammiser, he can produce tentacles capable of utilizing the Gammisers' powers and possesses power rivaling that of Ghost Grateful and Mugen Damashii.

Igor
 is a scientifically-minded and cold Gamma scientist who believes humans are inferior beings and works with Adel to invade the human world and use human souls to compensate for Edith's machine killing their people. After Edith went rogue, Igor assumed the former's position as Gamma World's magistrate. Amidst Adel's attempt to use the Demia Project to turn everyone in Gamma World and the human world into copies of himself, Igor is rescued by Akari Tsukimura and repays her by sacrificing himself to protect her from a mind-controlled Gamma. Following Kamen Rider Ghost's battle with the Great Eyeser, Igor awakens in his mortal body.

Alia
 is Alain and Adel's older sister and a former caretaker for the Fukami siblings. After becoming aware of Adel's plot to overthrow their father Adonis, she is forced to play along until Alain can return with reinforcements. Upon Alain's return, she reveals what Adel has done and entrusts Takeru Tenkūji with taking care of Alain for her while she stays behind to hinder Adel's plans. However, her first attempt is thwarted by Gammisers Climate and Planet, who destroy her Gamma Eyecon and return her to her mortal body, allowing Adel to take her captive. Alain and his allies eventually free Alia, who helps Takeru return Adel to his senses. After the Gammisers fuse with the Great Eye, Alia elects to stay in Gamma World to protect it while Takeru, Alain, and their allies defeat the Gammisers.

Utilizing a Proto-Mega Ulorder and a pink-colored Necrom Eyecon, Alia can transform into .

Adonis
 is the emperor of the Gamma World and the father of Alain, Adel, Alia, and Argos who cares for his people and family. During the Yayoi period, as detailed in the tie-in novel Kamen Rider Ghost: Memories to the Future, Adonis led a group of people in migrating from Earth to Planet Gamma to protect them from a barbaric king. After losing his wife , firstborn child Argos, and many of his comrades, Adonis created the Demia Project to ensure immortality for the Gamma. Due to this, he was chosen by the Great Eye and used its power to realize his magistrate Edith's machine, which he developed to transfer the Gamma World's population's souls into Eyecons. However, the machine killed more of their people, which led to Adonis reluctantly approving his son Adel and scientist Igor's idea to invade the human world to solve the problem.

Over time, Adonis came to regret the innocent lives being taken, causing him to doubt his actions. Before he could call off the invasion, Adel destroyed his father's Gamma Eyecon, imprisoned, and framed Adonis' youngest son Alain for regicide. Alain and Takeru Tenkūji eventually free Adonis, who sacrifices himself to protect Alain from Adel's army. Dying in Alain's arms, Adonis reaffirms his love for him and tells him to listen to his heart in the hopes of stopping him from making the same mistakes that he did.

Gyro
 is Alain's combat instructor and Ryūrai's former subordinate who was tasked with protecting Adonis during their people's migration from the human world to the Gamma World. Amidst Adel's plot to use the Demia Project to turn everyone in the human world and Gamma World into copies of himself, Gyro fears Adel is going too far and mercilessly putting their people's life energies at risk, but is forced to obey him. Following the Gammisers' defeat, Gyro is freed of the Demia Project and awakens in his mortal body. However, during the events of the V-Cinema, Ghost Re:Birth: Kamen Rider Specter, Gyro is killed by Danton.

As a Gamma Ultima, Gyro possesses the unique ability to reverse time within his surroundings and carries a sword.

Gamma Combatants
Gamma Combatants are Gamma Assaults who empower themselves using objects closely tied to historical figures to gain clothing-like armaments and weapons, similarly to Kamen Riders Ghost, Specter, and Necrom, among others.

: A Gamma Assault that fused with a Yari connected to Hozoin In'ei. He goes on a rampage with the Katana Gamma, during which they kill Takeru, who is later resurrected and granted the ability to become Kamen Rider Ghost. Using his newfound powers, Takeru kills the Yari Gamma.
: A Gamma Assault who fused fused with a katana connected to Kojiro Sasaki. He goes on a rampage with the Yari Gamma before he is eventually killed by Kamen Rider Ghost Musashi Damashii.
: A Gamma Assault that fused with a radio receiver antenna connected to Nikola Tesla. He forces a scientist named  to make an apparatus that will allow more Gamma to enter the human world. Using the device and the Edison Eyecon, the Electric Gamma transforms into a giant monster armed with a parabolic antenna-shaped cannon, but is killed by Kamen Rider Ghost Edison Damashii.
: A Gamma Assault that fused with a hatchet connected to Juraj Janosik. He kidnaps a journalist named  to force her to reveal what she knows about shady art dealer  and threaten to kill her unless he gets the Robin Eyecon, but is killed by Kamen Rider Ghost Robin Damashii.
: A Gamma Assault that fused with a copy of Lewis Carroll's Alice's Adventures in Wonderland who possesses the ability to create near-identical duplicates of himself. He attempts to take a hostage in exchange for the Nobunaga Eyecon, but is killed by Kamen Rider Ghost Robin Damashii.
: A Gamma Assault that fused with a fedora connected to Al Capone who possesses a machine gun-like arm. He attacks an empty elementary school, forces several city officials to do his bidding, and takes Akari and Onari hostage before he is killed by Kamen Rider Specter Tutankhamun Damashii.
: A Gamma Assault that fused with a jabot connected to Wolfgang Amadeus Mozart who is capable of producing concussive soundwaves, a cacophony of sound, and completely negating all sound within a  radius of himself. He haunts college student , who wishes to make a masterpiece, in an attempt to draw out Beethoven's ghost, before he is killed by Kamen Rider Ghost Beethoven Damashii. Another Onpu Gamma serves under Igor while trying to create presentation music for the Demia Project's launch. After failing to gain Igor's attention, the Onpu Gamma runs way and befriends the Art Supplies Gamma, Kanon Fukami, and Daitenkū-ji's residents. The two Gammas later depart for a trip around the world to learn more about it together. Along the way, the Onpu and Art Supplies Gamma witness the Demia Project's effects, are brainwashed by Adel, and have their souls erased by the Great Eyeser before Kamen Rider Ghost kills it, undoing its effects.
: A Gamma Assault that fused with a magnifying glass connected to Jean-Henri Fabre who can turn herself into a swarm of wasps. She is killed by Ghost Billy the Kid Damashii.
: A Gamma Assault that fused with a Green Dragon Crescent Blade connected to Guan Yu who wields the  spear and a dragon beard capable of breathing fire. He kidnaps Kenjirō Igarashi to lure out Benkei's spirit before he is killed by Kamen Rider Ghost Benkei Damashii.
: A Gamma Assault that fused with a space helmet connected to Yuri Gagarin who has the ability to hijack technological communication devices via a satellite and using them to steal a human's soul. He is killed by Kamen Rider Ghost Ryoma Damashii.
: A Gamma Assault that fused with a pair of scissors connected to Jack the Ripper who is armed with two blades that he can use to cut out a human's soul. He takes part in Igor's attack on the human world before the Knife Gamma is killed by Kamen Rider Ghost Himiko Damashii.
: A Gamma Assault that has fused with art supplies connected to Pablo Picasso who can turn his paintings into physical objects so long as the painting remains intact. Detesting violence, he is hunted by Igor and his fellow Gamma and tries to seek help from Kamen Rider Ghost. The Gazai Gamma later sacrifices himself to save Ghost from Necrom Specter and thanks the former for saving him from Igor and teaching him about friendship. After Ghost and Specter defeat Necrom however, the Gazai Gamma is mysteriously revived and transported to Daitenkū-ji, where he wholeheartedly helps his new friends, receives the nickname  from Akari Tsukimura, and develops a friendly rivalry with Onari. Eventually the Gazai Gamma leaves the temple to travel the world with the Onpu Gamma. Amidst their travels, the two Gamma witness the Demia Project's effects, are brainwashed by Adel, and have their souls erased by the Great Eyeser before Kamen Rider Ghost kills it, undoing its effects. The Gazai Gamma is voiced by  while his human form is portrayed by his suit actor .
: A Gamma Assault that fused with a French sword that belonged to Joan of Arc who wields  sword and refuses to hurt women and children. She serves Igor by stealing innocent souls and hunting Kamen Rider Ghost and Specter's Eyecons. After being defeated by Kamen Rider Ghost Toucon Boost Damashii and being freed from Igor's brainwashing, she repays him by freeing the souls she stole. In their rematch, Ghost destroys her, though she gracefully accepts this thanks him for a good battle.
: A Gamma Assault that fused with a pair of aviator goggles connected to Lothar von Richthofen before he is killed by Kamen Rider Necrom.
: A Gamma Assault that fused with a flying cap connected to Manfred von Richthofen before he is killed by Kamen Rider Ghost Grateful Damashii. The elder Hikoki Gamma is voiced by Atsushi Imaruoka.
: A Gamma Assault that fused with a propeller. He serves Igor until he is killed by Kamen Rider Ghost Mugen Damashii. The Hikoki Gamma Perfect is voiced by Atsushi Imaruoka.

Other Gamma Combatants
: A warrior monk-themed Gamma who contains the soul of Ninkan  and appears exclusively in the Televi-Kun DVD specials Kamen Rider Ghost: Ikkyu Eyecon Contention! Quick Wit Battle!! and Kamen Rider Ghost: Ikkyu Intimacy! Awaken, My Quick Wit Power!! He is killed by Kamen Rider Ghost Ore Damashii.
: A warrior monk-themed Gamma who contains the soul of Shōkaku, wields a Yari, and appears exclusively in the Televi-Kun DVD specials Kamen Rider Ghost: Ikkyu Eyecon Contention! Quick Wit Battle!! and Kamen Rider Ghost: Ikkyu Intimacy! Awaken, My Quick Wit Power!!. He is killed by Kamen Riders Ghost Ikkyu Damashii and Specter Pythagoras Damashii. The elder Sohei Gamma is also voiced by Hirofumi Tanaka.

Gammisers
The  are the Gamma World's pantheon who started out as an adaptable security system developed by Edith to prevent the Great Eye's power from being misused before attaining sentience and preventing him from fixing the flaws in his life preservation technology. Seeking to use the Great Eye's power to wipe out humanity, the Gammisers manipulate Adel into serving their needs and help them better understand emotions. After Kamen Rider Ghost destroys four of them, the remaining members convince Adel to let them fuse with him to grant him increased power until Adel realizes the error of his ways and allows him to be killed to prevent the Gammisers from achieving their goals.

The Gammisers are capable of assuming human forms that resemble Adel, absorbing human souls and assuming their forms, possessing, transforming, and/or fusing with Gamma Ultimas, regenerating from injuries, reviving themselves, analyzing enemy capabilities and preparing countermeasures against them, and preventing the 15 heroic Eyecons from coming together, though they are vulnerable to and can be permanently destroyed by Ghost in his Mugen Damashii form. While in their human forms, they can levitate, produce energy beams from their palms, and use their hands as makeshift swords.

: A Gammiser with pyrokinesis. During its first encounter with Ghost, it possesses Javel and transforms him into a Gamma Ultima Fire, but is ultimately defeated by Ghost Grateful Damashii. In its second encounter with the Rider, Gammiser Fire absorbs Gammiser Gravity to increase its power, but they are destroyed by Kamen Rider Ghost Mugen Damashii.
: A Gammiser with chronokinesis and the ability to counter Tutankhamun Damashii.
: A Gammiser with gyrokinesis and the ability to awaken dormant Gamma Holes. After successfully stealing most of the Kamen Riders' equipment, Gammiser Gravity fuses with Gammiser Fire, but they are destroyed by Kamen Rider Ghost Mugen Damashii.
: A Gammiser with hydrokinesis, the ability to duplicate itself, and the ability to convert Gamma Superior into copies of its fellow Gammisers.
: A Gammiser with aerokinesis.
: A Gammiser capable of assuming a sword-like form that can split further into two swords and countering Musashi Damashii. It fuses with Gammiser Magnetic to foil Alia's attempt to rebel against Adel, but they are destroyed by Kamen Rider Ghost Mugen Damashii.
: A Gammiser with electrokinesis and the ability to counter Edison Damashii.
: A Gammiser capable of assuming a phoenix-like bow form and countering Robin Damashii.
: A Gammiser capable of assuming a bat-like rifle form and counter Billy the Kid Damashii.
: A Gammiser with atmokinesis and the ability to counter Grimm Damashii. It joins Gammiser Planet in thwarting Alia's attempt to rebel against Adel before the Gammisers are destroyed by Kamen Rider Ghost Mugen Damashii.
: A Gammiser with sonokinesis and the ability to counter Beethoven Damashii.
: A Gammiser with magnokinesis and the ability to counter Houdini Damashii. It fuses with Gammiser Blade to foil Alia's attempt to rebel Adel, but they are destroyed by Kamen Rider Ghost Mugen Damashii.
: A Gammiser capable of assuming a spider-like war hammer form and countering Benkei Damashii.
: A Gammiser capable of assuming a cobra-like spear form and counter Goemon Damashii.
: A Gammiser with geokinesis and the ability to counter Ryoma Damashii. It joins Gammiser Climate in thwarting Alia's attempt to rebel against Adel before the Gammisers are destroyed by Kamen Rider Ghost Mugen Damashii.

Kanon Fukami
, original name , is an artificial human created by Danton and Makoto's younger sister whose soul was trapped in a Gamma Eyecon called the  following the siblings' accidental transportation to Gamma World ten years prior to the series. In the present, Makoto works to revive her until Takeru wishes to do so. Following this, she continues to support her brother and Takeru in their battles against the Gamma and Gammisers throughout the series before helping Makoto and Alain reform Gamma World in the series finale. As of the V-Cinema Ghost Re:Birth: Kamen Rider Specter, Kanon has married Alain and become the empress of Gamma World. During the events of the web series  Kamen Rider Specter × Blades, she has obtained the means to transform into .

Chikara Saionji
While Saionji expressed regret for his treachery, he believed Ryū's hope for a better future was misplaced as the former planned to use the Gamma he summoned to his world for his own agenda.

After acquiring five heroic Eyecons as of the present as part of his plans, he waits for Kamen Riders Ghost and Specter to collect the remaining ten before stealing them with the intention of using the monolith underneath Daitenkū-ji to demand the power to take over the world. Due to not possessing a Ghost Driver however, he is killed by the monolith's power.

In the "Hyper Battle DVD" special Kamen Rider Ghost: Truth! The Secret of Heroes' Eyecons!, Saionji is resurrected through a Gamma Eyecon and manipulates the Da Vinci Gamma to fight the Kamen Riders until he abandons his goal upon realizing Ryū still considered him a friend in spite of the former's jealousy. In the V-Cinema Ghost Re:Birth: Kamen Rider Specter, Saionji sacrifices himself save Kanon Fukami from Danton.

Steve Bills
 is the CEO of the network company  who Igor possessed as part of Adel's vision for the Demia Project. Using Bills, Igor buys out the former's corporate rivals to expand his influence and hide the Gamma's plans. After Kamen Rider Ghost and his allies infiltrate Deep Connect, Igor and Bills stage a Gamma attack to clear the latter of any suspicions, but their secret is exposed regardless while Onari, Shibuya Hachiōji, Narita Kisarazu, and Alain rescue Bills from Igor's control. Following this, the CEO willingly takes responsibility for what Igor and Adel did while using him.

Great Eye
When Adonis and his people first arrived to the Gamma World, the Great Eye chose Adonis to receive its power as he became emperor. However, a plague claimed the lives of Adonis' wife and first-born son, which inspired Edith to use the Great Eye's power to develop Eyecon technology, a machine capable of granting their people immortality, and the Gammisers to protect the Great Eye. When the machine claimed more lives due to the Gammisers preventing Edith from fixing a flaw in it, Edith created 15 Eyecons based on 15 heroic historical figures to bring the Great Eye to Earth.

In the present, Chikara Saionji and Adel attempt to harness the Great Eye's power, but it kills the former while Takeru Tenkūji, who the Great Eye developed an interest in, Edith, and Adonis interfere with Adel's plot. The Gammisers later manipulate Adel into using the Demia Project to take control of the Great Eye and use its power to bring everyone under the Demia Project under his control before fusing with the Great Eye to transform into the Great Eyeser, but they are destroyed by Takeru, freeing the Great Eye. After it revives Takeru, the Great Eye ends the Demia Project and leaves Earth.

Frejya and Freyr
 is an avatar of the Great Eye who first appears during the events of the web series Kamen Rider Ghost: Legendary! Riders' Souls! to prepare Kamen Riders Ghost and Specter for the Dark Mind. To facilitate her plot, she splits herself in two, with one half becoming became , who steals Ghost and Specter's Eyecons and summons the fallen enemies of past Kamen Riders to challenge them while Freya herself helps Ghost and Specter collect the Legend Rider Eyecons before she and Freyr were absorbed by Xibalba. After being freed, Freya reveals the purpose behind her actions before absorbing Freyr and taking her leave.

Amidst the Gammisers' plot to manipulate Adel into helping them take the Great Eye's power for themselves, Freya and Freyr return to reveal their true nature, the Great Eye's interest in Takeru, and warn him of the Gammisers' threat. Following the Gammisers' defeat, Freya visits Takeru one more time before leaving Earth with the Great Eye.

Guest characters
: The local mailman who serves Daitenkū-ji and helps Takeru find Eyecons.
: A physicist and Ryū Tenkūji's associate in studying the Eyecons and Gamma who sought to save Makoto and Kanon Fukami from Gamma World, but was unsuccessful due to Ryū's death and protecting Takeru ten years prior to the series. As a result of this and learning his colleague Chikara Saionji had betrayed him and Ryū, Igarashi became traumatized and anti-social and was forced to go on the run from Saionji and the Gammas. In the present, Takeru finds Igarashi and helps reignite his desire to save the Fukami siblings. Months later, Igarashi has recovered from his trauma and learns of the Fukami siblings' safe return. Before he departs, he gives Akari Tsukimura his journal and acknowledges her courage as a scientist.
: An old woman and the first owner of the  takoyaki shop who has known Takeru, Akari, and the Fukami siblings since they were children. After he becomes a fugitive of his empire, Fumi helps Alain acclimate to the human world until she dies peacefully in her sleep. As a child, Fumi is portrayed .
: A revived porcupine-themed cyborg from the Badan Empire who works for Shocker and can use his weaponized quills to trap people and as projectile weapons. He is destroyed by Kamen Rider Ghost and Zyuoh Eagle.
: A young zoologist and the leader of the Zyuohgers who can transform into , among other forms. He assists Takeru in protecting the fugitive Alain and destroying Yamaarashi-Roid.
: Fumi's granddaughter who takes over Fūmin following her death.
: A master gamer and surgical intern who battles the Bugsters to save his patients. First appearing in the film Kamen Rider Ghost the Movie: The 100 Eyecons and Ghost's Fated Moment, he assists Takeru in fighting the Dark Necroms. In the series finale, Ex-Aid helps protect Ayumu from Kamen Rider Gemn.
: Takeru Tenkūji and Chloe's son from the future who was born with the Great Eye's leftover power when Takeru resurrected his mother. Throughout the series finale, the stage show Kamen Rider Ghost: Final Stage, and the tie-in novel Kamen Rider Ghost: Memories to the Future, when Takeru seemingly died from the Great Demia's attack, Ayumu jumps into the past in the hopes of learning what kind of person Takeru was in his youth, resulting in an encounter with Kamen Riders Gemn and Ex-Aid after stealing a Rider Gashat. After being reassured by his father in the past, Ayumu returns to his time to don the mantle of Kamen Rider Ghost. Demia tries to counter this by sending a clone of itself to prevent Ayumu's birth, but the boy follows it into the past as well and connects with Takeru and Ryu to defeat the clone. Returning to his time once more, Ayumu counters Demia's immortality by striking its core and freeing his father from the AI's bindings.

Spin-off exclusive characters

Da Vinci Gamma
The  is a Mona Lisa/Vitruvian Man/aerial screw-themed Gamma Superior who contains the soul of his namesake. First appearing in the non-canonical crossover film Kamen Rider × Kamen Rider Ghost & Drive: Super Movie War Genesis, he sends Kamen Riders Ghost and Drive 10 years in the past so he can take over the present. After absorbing the Raphael and Michelangelo Gammas' power, the Da Vinci Gamma transforms into the giant , but is killed by Ghost and Drive. In the "Hyper Battle DVD" special Kamen Rider Ghost: Truth! The Secret of Heroes' Eyecons!, Chikara Saionji creates a second Da Vinci Gamma from a facsimile of the Mona Lisa and manipulates the latter into attacking Ghost for not choosing him to be one of the 15 Eyecons needed to revive him. After Ghost explains his reasoning and resonating with a reformed Saionji, the Da Vinci Gamma allows himself to be killed so his spirit can transform into an Eyecon.

In combat, the Da Vinci Gamma possesses the ability to produce an energy tornado, throw a plethora of Mona Lisa paintings at his enemies, and time travel capabilities.

Raphael
The  is a Portrait of Pietro Bembo/Sistine Madonna-themed Gamma Superior who contains the soul of his namesake, can fire feather-shaped energy bullets, and appears exclusively in the non-canonical crossover film Kamen Rider × Kamen Rider Ghost & Drive: Super Movie War Genesis. He and the Michelangelo Gamma attack Akari Tsukimura in 2005 until the Da Vinci Gamma brings the pair to the present so he can absorb them and transform into the Renaissance Gamma.

Michelangelo
The  is a David/The Fall of Man-themed Gamma Superior who contains the soul of his namesake, possesses superhuman strength and a snake, and appears exclusively in the non-canonical crossover film Kamen Rider × Kamen Rider Ghost & Drive: Super Movie War Genesis. He and the Raphael Gamma attack Akari Tsukimura in 2005 until the Da Vinci Gamma brings the pair to the present so he can absorb them and transform into the Renaissance Gamma.

Xibalba
 is a mysterious Gamma Ultima who appears exclusively in the web series Kamen Rider Ghost: Legendary! Riders' Souls. He targets and absorbs the twins Freyr and Frejya to evolve into a Gamma Ultima Fire, only for Kamen Riders Ghost and Specter to revert him to his original form before they kill him.

Nova Shocker
 is a splinter faction of Ambassador Hell's branch of the terrorist organization Shocker who seeks to conquer the global economy and appears exclusively in the crossover film Kamen Rider 1.

Wolga
 is a hyena-themed cyborg monster, former member of Shocker, and founding member and leader of Nova Shocker. Following a cameo appearance in episode 24 of the series, he appears in the crossover film Kamen Rider 1, leading Nova Shocker in their quest to steal power from Japan and obtain the Alexander Eyecon, only to be possessed by the latter and destroyed by Kamen Riders Ghost, Specter, and 1. In the DVD-exclusive final episode of the web series Kamen Rider Ghost: Legendary! Riders' Souls!, Wolga is revived by the Alexander Eyecon and seeks revenge on Ghost and Specter, only to be destroyed once more by the former.

In combat, Wolga possesses electrokinesis, superhuman speed, and the ability to assume a human form.

Riders' Souls!

Eagla
 is a cyborg monster, former member of Shocker, and executive member of Nova Shocker who wields a rapier and appears exclusively in the crossover film Kamen Rider 1. She assists Nova Shocker in their plot to steal power from Japan and obtain the Alexander Eyecon until she is killed by Wolga Alexander.

Buffal
 is a condor-themed cyborg monster, former member of Shocker, and executive member of Nova Shocker. First appearing in the crossover film Kamen Rider 1, he assists Nova Shocker in their plot to steal power from Japan and obtain the Alexander Eyecon until he is destroyed by Kamen Rider Ghost. In the DVD-exclusive final episode of the web series Kamen Rider Ghost: Legendary! Riders' Souls!, Buffal is revived by the Alexander Eyecon and seeks revenge on Ghost, only to be destroyed by him once more.

Riders' Souls!

Alexander
 is a Gamma containing the soul of Alexander the Great who was trapped in a Gamma Eyecon and appears exclusively in the crossover film Kamen Rider 1. The Eyecon was originally in the possession of the Dark Mind, who gave it to Ambassador Hell of the terrorist organization Shocker, though the latter was unable to use its power. Following Ambassador Hell's death at Kamen Riders 1's hands in the 1970s, the Eyecon ended up in the hands of Tobei Tachibana's granddaughter, Mayu. This allowed Alexander to possess her and instigate a civil war between the revived Ambassador Hell's Shocker branch and the splinter faction Nova Shocker Co., Ltd. After Ambassador Hell's Shocker capture Mayu, Nova Shocker member Wolga obtains Alexander's Eyecon, who transforms him into , kills Wolga's ally Eagla, and takes over his body and command of Nova Shocker. However, Kamen Riders Ghost and Specter weaken Wolga Alexander before Kamen Rider 1 kills him and Ambassador Hell destroys Alexander's Eyecon.

Sometime later, during the events of the DVD-exclusive final episode of the web series Kamen Rider Ghost: Legendary! Riders' Souls!, the Dark Mind recreates the Alexander Eyecon and turns him into , though the latter is destroyed by Kamen Rider Ghost.

Dark Mind
The  is the "manifestation of darkness" that resembles a Gamma Ultima. During the events of the web series Kamen Rider Ghost: Legendary! Riders' Souls!, the Dark Mind recreates the Alexander Eyecon and transforms him into Gamma Ultima Alexander before personally battling Kamen Riders Ghost and Specter, only to be defeated by the former.

Riders' Souls!

Daigo Fukami
First appearing in the film Kamen Rider Ghost the Movie: The 100 Eyecons and Ghost's Fated Moment and after taking on a new name, Daigo left Makoto and Kanon at Daitenkū-ji following the death of his wife Naoko. However, Daigo was killed by Adel and resurfaced as a ghost with the ability to transform into . In the present, Daigo encounters Makoto in Argos' world and reconciles with him upon telling him of what happened. In the novel Kamen Rider Ghost: Memories to the Future, it is revealed the Fukami family received their names from Ryū Tenkūji.

Argos
 is the kindly first born son of Adonis who died from plague and appears exclusively in the film Kamen Rider Ghost the Movie: The 100 Eyecons and Ghost's Fated Moment. Upon capturing Ghost and collecting all 100 Eyecons he needs, Argos dons the Extremer Driver and transforms into . However, Ghost frees himself and defeats Argos.

Similarly to Ghost and Specter, Argos utilizes a Ghost Driver and the Dark Ghost Eyecon to transform into Kamen Rider Dark Ghost. While transformed, he wields the Gan Gun Saber and the Sunglasseslasher as well as use other Eyecons to assume different Damashii forms, such as Napoleon, Ikkyū, and Pythagoras Damashii. As Kamen Rider Extremer, Argos can remove his cloak to unfurl his multi-eyed  and possesses the power of 100 historical figures' spirits.

Kamen Rider Dark Necroms
 are three doppelgängers of Necrom who serve Argos, use the Proto-Mega Ulorder and a differently colored Necrom Eyecon to transform, possess their own versions of the Machine Ghostriker and Iguana Ghostriker, can perform the  finisher, and appear exclusively in the film Kamen Rider Ghost the Movie: The 100 Eyecons and Ghost's Fated Moment.

: A servant of Argos' who can transform into the red-colored  and is eventually killed by Kamen Rider Specter.
: A servant of Argos' who can transform into the blue-colored  and is eventually killed by Kamen Rider Ex-Aid.
: A servant of Argos' who can transform into the yellow-colored  and is eventually killed by Kamen Rider Necrom.

Danton
 is a cruel and immoral co-creator of Gamma World who appears exclusively in the V-Cinema Ghost Re:Birth: Kamen Rider Specter. Having worked alongside Adonis and Edith in colonizing Gamma World, Danton realized the Demia Project and the Gammisers were flawed and that the system Adonis developed around the Great Eye would collapse. After killing Gyro and setting about creating a new world for the Gamma, Danton encounters one of his successful creations, Makoto Fukami, who initially accepts him before learning of his true intentions. Danton transforms into a monstrous form called , but is ultimately killed by Makoto.

Chloe
 is Danton's non-biological daughter who came into his care prior to her mother's death, was modified by him due to her weak body, and first appears in the V-Cinema Ghost Re:Birth: Kamen Rider Specter. Taking Takeru's life advice to heart, Chloe travels to the human world to search for him during the events of the tie-in novel Kamen Rider Ghost: Memories to the Future, but a series of miscommunications causes her to be targeted by riot police. After saving him from a vehicular accident, Takeru sacrifices half of his life force and the Mugen Eyecon to resurrect her.

In the future, Chloe marries Takeru and has a son named Ayumu. After seeing her husband being assimilated by Demia, she is forced to lie to Ayumu out of fear that the Tenkūjis would fight each other as enemies. To her relief, Ayumu takes on the mantle of Ghost and successfully saves Takeru by killing Demia.

Evil king
The unnamed evil king is an antagonist of the first chapter of the tie-in novel Kamen Rider Ghost: Memories to the Future. During the Yayoi period, the king maintained supremacy by raging wars on neighboring civilizations and refused a peace treaty with Adonis' faction. His actions led to Adonis migrating his people to the Gamma World for their protection and putting the events of Kamen Rider Ghost as a whole into motion.

Ryūrai
 is the commander of Adonis' faction of people who would became Gamma who appears exclusively in the tie-in novel Kamen Rider Ghost: Memories to the Future. After fighting off the evil king who threatened the Gamma tribe, Ryūrai volunteered to stay on Earth while Adonis led their people to Planet Gamma to guard the monolith bridging the two worlds together from the evil king's forces. Having entrusted his underling Gyro to protect Adonis, Ryūrai buries the monolith under the land where the Daitenkū-ji Temple would be built on and survived by his descendants, the Tenkūji family.

Naoko Fukami
 is the cousin of Takeru's mother, Yuri, who became the young boy's caretaker while she was still alive. When Godai arrived on Earth, Naoko married him and agreed to adopt Makoto and Kanon as their own children. However, she died soon after from illness.

Demia
 is the artificial intelligence of the Gamma faction which Igor developed during Adel's tenure as the ruler of Planet Gamma. Using the Deep Connect company as a medium, Demia is responsible for enslaving mankind on Earth for the Gammisers until the Great Eyeser is destroyed by Kamen Rider Ghost. In the tie-in novel Kamen Rider Ghost: Memories to the Future, Demia is revealed to have saved its server to a backup system prior to its destruction and transforms into  to wage war against mankind years after the series ended. Demia defeats and absorbs Takeru into its body, which leads to Takeru's son Ayumu eventually inheriting the mantle of Kamen Rider Ghost. Demia attempts to send a clone of itself into the past to avert Ayumu's birth, but fails when three generations of Tenkūjis unite their powers. Ayumu would later destroy Demia's core to cancel its self-regenerating powers and destroy it, saving the assimilated Takeru in the process.

Robes, Muller, and Camille
They seek to use Makoto and Kanon Fukami to reach their goal of creating ultimate lifeforms, only for Robes, Muller, and Camille are killed by Kamen Riders Saber and Ghost, Sin Specter and Kanon Specter, and Blades, respectively.

Notes

References

External links
Cast on TV Asahi

Ghost characters
Characters
Kamen Rider Ghost
Seven deadly sins in popular culture